House by the Sea is the second studio album of Levinhurst, released in 2007.

Reception

Margaret Reges of Allmusic gave it 3 out of 5 stars, writing "House by the Sea is graced with a continuity and vision that surpasses its predecessor. Unfortunately, there's a fine line between continuity and humdrum homogeneity, and House by the Sea bumbles into the realm of sleep-inducing monotony by the time the fifth track rolls around."

Track listing
"Nobody Cares" (4:27)	
"Never Going to Dream Again" (3:57)	
"Beautiful Lie" (5:35)	
"Unreality"	(1:35)	
"I Am"	(2:59)	
"Heart and Soul"	(4:22)	
"Another Way" (4:19)	
"Forgiven" (4:38)	
"House by the Sea" (4:09)

Personnel
Cindy Levinson - vocals
Lol Tolhurst - keyboards, drums, synthesizer
Eric Bradley - acoustic, electric, and bass guitars
Gray Tolhurst - guitar

References

2007 albums
Levinhurst albums